Someone Special may refer to:
 Someone Special (United States Navy), U.S. Navy recruiting film for the U.S. Navy SEALs during the Vietnam War
 Someone Special (film), South Korean romantic comedy film, 2004
 "Someone Special", song by Swedish rock band Hardcore Superstar from the album Bad Sneakers and a Piña Colada

See also
 "Miracles (Someone Special)", a 2017 song by Coldplay featuring Big Sean